This is a list of American breads. Bread is a staple food prepared from a dough of flour and water, usually by baking. Throughout recorded history it has been popular around the world and is one of humanity's oldest foods, having been of importance since the dawn of agriculture.

This list includes breads that originated in the United States.

American breads

 Adobe bread – type of bread typical of the Pueblo peoples of the Southwestern United States, it is often shaped like animals typical of the region. The dough often contains meat, vegetables, seeds, or nuts.
 Amish friendship bread
 Anadama bread – traditional yeast bread of New England in the United States made with wheat flour, cornmeal, molasses and sometimes rye flour.
 Banana bread – first became a standard feature of American cookbooks with the popularization of baking soda and baking powder in the 1930s; appeared in Pillsbury's 1933 Balanced Recipes cookbook. 
 Beaten biscuit – Southern food from the United States, dating from the 19th century. They differ from regular American soft-dough biscuits in that they are more like  hardtack. In New England they are called "sea biscuits", as they were staples aboard whaling ships.
 Biscuit – in the United States and parts of Canada, and widely used in popular American English, is a small bread with a firm browned crust and a soft interior.
 Boston brown bread – also known as New England brown bread
 Bulkie roll – New England regional variety of sandwich roll
 Cornbread
  Cuban bread
 Frybread
 Graham bread – invented by Sylvester Graham in 1829 for his vegetarian diet, it was high in fiber, made with non-sifted whole-wheat flour and free from the chemical additives that were common in white bread at that time such as alum and chlorine.
 Hot water corn bread
 Hushpuppy – savory food made from cornmeal batter that is deep fried or baked rolled as a small ball or occasionally other shapes.
 American muffin
 Muffuletta – both a type of round Sicilian sesame bread and a popular sandwich originating among Italian immigrants in New Orleans, Louisiana using the same bread.
 Parker House roll – invented at the Parker House Hotel in Boston during the 1870s and still served there, it is a bread roll made by flattening the center of a ball of dough with a rolling pin so that it becomes an oval shape and then folding the oval in half.
 Pepperoni roll 
 Popover
 Pullman loaf
 San Francisco sourdough - a specialty form of French bread with a crispy brown crust and a distinctly "sour" taste, which derives from the fructilactobacillus sanfranciscensis bacteria in the fermented sourdough starter. French bakers are suspected to have introduced sourdough bread to the San Francisco area during the California Gold Rush in the 1850s 
 Salt-rising bread
 Scali bread
 Sloosh
 Texas toast – type of packaged bread (not sold toasted as the name implies) which is sold sliced at double the typical thickness of most sliced breads

See also

 Cuisine of the United States
 History of California bread
 List of American foods
 List of American sandwiches
 List of baked goods
 List of breads
 List of bread dishes
 List of bread rolls
 List of buns

References

External links
 

American breads
Lists of breads
Breads